Douglas Huff, Jr. (January 8, 1931 - September 23, 1988) was an American politician.

Born in Chicago, Illinois, Huff served in the United States Army. He went to Malcolm X College and Roosevelt University. Huffman was the executive director of East Garfield Organization. From 1975 to 1988, Huff served in the Illinois House of Representatives and was a Democrat. In 1988, he resigned from the Illinois General Assembly after being convicted in the United States District Court for income tax evasion and was sentenced to four years in prison on September 9, 1988. Huff died at St, Mary of Nazareth Medical Center in Chicago, Illinois after suffering a stroke.

Notes

1931 births
1988 deaths
Politicians from Chicago
Malcolm X College alumni
Roosevelt University alumni
Democratic Party members of the Illinois House of Representatives
Illinois politicians convicted of crimes
20th-century American politicians